Voser is a surname. Notable people with the surname include:

Kay Voser (born 1987), Swiss footballer
Peter Voser (born 1958), Swiss businessman

See also
Moser (surname)